Comano Terme (Comàn in local dialect) is an Italian comune (municipality) of the province of Trentino in northern Italy. It was created on 1 January 2010 by the union of the former comuni of Bleggio Inferiore and Lomaso.

History

The municipality was created after a referendum, called on 27 September 2009, in both the comuni. Its name derives from the spa (terme) located in the village of Comano, formerly part of Lomaso (Lomaß).

Geography
The municipality counts the civil parishes (frazioni) of Biè, Bleggio Inferiore (the municipal seat), Bono, Cares, Cillà, Comano, Comighella, Dasindo, Duvredo, Godenzo, Lomaso (also named Campo Lomaso), Lundo, Poia, Ponte Arche (partly located in Stenico), Santa Croce, Sesto, Tignerone, Val d'Algone, Vergonzo, Vigo Lomaso, Villa

Comano Terme borders with the municipalities of Arco,  Bleggio Superiore, Bocenago, Dorsino, Dro, Fiavè, Giustino, Massimeno, Ragoli, San Lorenzo in Banale, Stenico, Tenno and Tione di Trento.

Main sights
Spa of Comano
Campo Castle 
Restor Castle 
Spine Castle

Personalities
Lorenzo Guetti
Giovanni Prati

References

External links

 Comano Terme official municipal website
Spa of Comano official website

Spa towns in Italy